KSGF-FM (104.1 MHz) is a radio station broadcasting a News Talk Information format. Licensed to Ash Grove, Missouri, United States, it serves the Springfield, Missouri area.  The station is owned by SummitMedia.

Journal Communications and the E. W. Scripps Company announced on July 30, 2014 that the two companies would merge to create a new broadcast company under the E.W. Scripps Company name that owned the two companies' broadcast properties, including KSGF-FM. The transaction was completed in 2015, pending shareholder and regulatory approvals. Scripps exited radio in 2018; the Springfield stations went to SummitMedia in a four-market, $47 million deal completed on November 1, 2018.

Programming
KSGF broadcasts a News/Talk radio format. Weekday programming includes a local morning show from 6-9am called, "KSGF Mornings with Nick Reed," hosted by Nick Reed. The remainder of the weekday is taken up by syndicated shows hosted by Glenn Beck from 9am to Noon, Dana Loesch from Noon to 2pm, Sean Hannity from 2pm to 5pm, Mark Levin from 5pm to 8pm, Ben Shapiro from 8pm to 10pm, Armstrong and Getty from 10pm to 1am, Red Eye Radio from 1am to 6am.

Weekend programming includes many local shows including James Clary, Kyle Wyatt, Dustin Atwood, and Sarah Myers. Local news comes from the KTTS news team and national news comes from Fox News Radio.

References

External links
 

SGF-FM
News and talk radio stations in the United States